Cédric Vasseur (born 18 August 1970) is a French former professional road racing cyclist, and current general manager of UCI WorldTeam . As a rider, Vasseur competed between 1993 and 2007 for the Novemail–Histor,  and  squads. Vasseur was considered an all-rounder who could do well in a variety of races. He raced in all of the spring classics such as Tour of Flanders and Paris–Roubaix, and won a stage of the Dauphiné Libéré stage race as well as two at the Tour de France.

Career

Professional rider
Born in Hazebrouck, Nord, Vasseur turned professional with the team Novemail in 1993, and switched to the  team in 1995 which then became Crédit Agricole in 1998. His first professional victory is also his most famous: it was his solo 147-kilometre breakaway by which he won stage 5 of the 1997 Tour de France.  He then wore the yellow jersey as the race leader for five days.

In the 2000 and 2001 seasons, he rode for the  team and participated in the 2000 Tour de France. However, his exclusion from the 2001 Tour de France team led to his switch to the Cofidis team. He cited personal differences with the USPS team star Lance Armstrong, which was widely quoted in French cycling publications. In the wake of the publication of the USADA memo that proves Lance Armstrong doping practices, he explained that he was excluded because of his refusal to participate in Armstrong's doping program. ("Inutile de rappeler que je n'ai rien à voir dans cette organisation à qui je dois fort probablement ma non-participation au Tour 2001 ainsi que mon éviction de l'équipe.")

In 2004, Vasseur was arrested in suspicion of doping offences along with several other Cofidis riders, notably including then individual time trial champion David Millar. A counter-analysis later proved negative and Vasseur's name was then cleared.  Vasseur also claimed some of the evidence in his witness statement had been forged. However, Vasseur was barred from riding in the 2004 Tour de France since the investigation had not concluded by the time that the race had started. He retired at the end of 2007 after taking a second Tour de France stage win that year.

After retirement
Following his retirement from racing, Vasseur served as head of the CPA (the professional cyclists' association), and as a TV pundit. In October 2017 the  team announced that Vasseur would return to the team as their new manager.

Personal life
Vasseur came from a family of cyclists: his father Alain Vasseur competed in the 1970, 1971 and 1974 editions of the Tour de France. His father also won a stage of the Tour de France after a solo breakaway.

Major results

1993
 1st Stage 6 Tour de l'Avenir
1994
 2nd Grand Prix de la Ville de Lillers
 8th GP Ouest–France
 10th Overall Tour du Limousin
1995
 6th Paris–Camembert
 7th Overall Regio-Tour
 10th Overall Tour de l'Oise
1996
 1st Stage 4 Grand Prix du Midi Libre
 8th Paris–Bourges
 10th Overall Four Days of Dunkirk
1997
 Tour de France
1st Stage 5
Held  Stages 5–9
 2nd Grand Prix de la Ville de Lillers
 3rd Polynormande
 6th Chrono des Herbiers
 7th Overall Grand Prix du Midi Libre
 7th Giro del Piemonte
 8th GP Ouest–France
1998
 6th Overall Route du Sud
 6th Paris–Camembert
1999
 3rd Road race, National Road Championships
 7th Overall Circuit Cycliste Sarthe
1st Stage 1
 7th Grand Prix d'Isbergues
 8th Overall Grand Prix du Midi Libre
 8th Trophée des Grimpeurs
2001
 4th Overall Four Days of Dunkirk
 10th Paris–Camembert
2002
 1st Grand Prix d'Isbergues
 5th Road race, National Road Championships
 6th Overall Four Days of Dunkirk
1st Stage 5
 6th Paris–Bourges
 6th Boucles de l'Aulne
 8th Giro del Piemonte
2003
 1st Overall Paris–Corrèze
1st Stage 2
 1st Overall Hessen-Rundfahrt
1st Stage 1
 1st Stage 7 Critérium du Dauphiné Libéré
 1st Stage 2 Tour du Limousin
 4th Grand Prix Pino Cerami
 4th Route Adélie
 5th GP Chiasso
 6th Giro di Lombardia
 6th Grand Prix de Wallonie
 8th A Travers le Morbihan
2004
 1st Stage 4 Tour de l'Ain
 1st Stage 4 Tour du Limousin
 3rd GP Chiasso
 4th Paris–Bourges
 8th GP Ouest–France
 9th Milano–Torino
2005
 3rd Tour du Haut Var
 5th Sparkassen Giro Bochum
 6th Overall Étoile de Bessèges
 9th Grand Prix d'Isbergues
2006
 1st Grand Prix d'Isbergues
2007
 1st Stage 10 Tour de France
 2nd Grand Prix de Wallonie

Grand Tour general classification results timeline

References

External links
 

1970 births
Living people
People from Hazebrouck
French male cyclists
French Tour de France stage winners
Sportspeople from Nord (French department)
Directeur sportifs
Cyclists from Hauts-de-France